A chess database is a database of chess games.

List of notable chess databases 

 Chess Assistant
 Chess Informant Expert
 Chess opening book (computers)
 Chess.com
 Chess24.com
 ChessBase
 Lichess
 Shane's Chess Information Database

See also 

 Computer chess
 List of chess games
 List of chess software

References